Catherine Charlebois (born July 16, 1987) is an American Broadway actress originally from Andover, Massachusetts. She is best known for her portrayal of Nessarose Thropp in the musical Wicked. She currently resides in Virginia.

Education 
Charlebois graduated from Andover High School (Massachusetts) in 2005 and from Syracuse University (New York) in 2009 with a BFA in musical theatre. During her time at Syracuse University, Charlebois played the following roles:
 Anabelle Glick – Lucky Stiff (Syracuse University Stage); October 5–17, 2007
 Hodel – Fiddler on the Roof (Syracuse University Stage); November 28 – December 30, 2007
 Johanna – Sweeney Todd (Syracuse University Stage); April 24 – May 10, 2008
 Mick's Pick, Ensemble – Steel Pier (Syracuse University Stage); Oct 3–12, 2008

Professional career 
She is a stylist with a professional fashion/style blog
 Billie Delgado – Hurricane (NYTF; Theatre at St. Clement's); September 28 – October 10, 2009
 Universal Swing, Swing, u/s Nessarose, u/s Midwife – Wicked (All Productions); 2010
 Shelby – Steel Magnolias (Triad Stage); April 10 – May 8, 2011
 Nessarose – Wicked (Munchkinland Tour);  January 17 – October 11, 2012
 Nessarose – Wicked (Gershwin Theatre); December 4, 2012 – May 25, 2014
 Nessarose (emergency cover) – Wicked (Munchkinland Tour); July 9 – Aug 28, 2014
 Nessarose (emergency cover) – Wicked (Gershwin Theatre); January 7, 2015 – Jan 21, 2015
 Nessarose – Wicked (Gershwin Theatre); Jan 22, 2015 – March 8, 2015
 Belle – Beauty and the Beast (Music Theatre Wichita); June 28 – July 3, 2016
 Nessarose – Wicked (Munchkinland Tour);  August 22, 2017 – April 22, 2018
Nessarose (emergency cover)  Wicked (Munchkinland Tour); June 20, 2018 - August 5, 2018
Nessarose (emergency cover)  Wicked (Munchkinland Tour); December 23, 2021 - Present

References 

Living people
American actresses
1987 births
21st-century American women